Gladfelter is a surname.  Notable people with the surname include:

Amy Gladfelter (born 1974), American cell biologist
Irl A. Gladfelter (born 1944), American Lutheran archbishop
Millard E. Gladfelter (1900–1995), American academic administrator